Ocean's Eight (stylized on screen as Ocean's 8) is a 2018 American heist comedy film directed by Gary Ross and written by Ross and Olivia Milch. The film is both a continuation of and a spin-off from Steven Soderbergh's Ocean's trilogy and features an ensemble cast including Sandra Bullock, Cate Blanchett, Anne Hathaway, Mindy Kaling, Sarah Paulson, Awkwafina, Rihanna, and Helena Bonham Carter. The film follows a group of women led by Debbie Ocean, the sister of Danny Ocean, who plan a sophisticated heist at the annual Met Gala at the Metropolitan Museum of Art in New York City.

After the release of Ocean's Thirteen in 2007, Soderbergh stated he had no intentions of making a fourth film, citing his desire to have the series "go out on top". However, an all-female spin-off was announced in October 2015, and much of the cast signed on by August 2016. Filming took place from October 2016 to March 2017 around Manhattan.

Ocean's 8 premiered at Alice Tully Hall on June 5, 2018, and was released by Warner Bros. Pictures in the United States on June 8, 2018, 11 years to the day after the release of Ocean's Thirteen. It grossed $298 million worldwide and received generally positive reviews from critics, who particularly praised the acting ensemble.

Plot
Newly paroled con artist Debbie Ocean, Danny Ocean's younger sister, convinces former partner in crime Lou to join her in a new heist. They assemble their team: once-famous-now-dead-end fashion designer Rose Weil, who owes the IRS; jewelry maker Amita, who vies for more independence from her mother; security hacker Nine Ball; street hustler and pickpocket Constance; and profiteer Tammy, who fences stolen goods out of her suburban home.

Debbie plans to steal the Toussaint, a $150 million Cartier necklace, during the upcoming Met Gala, using the host, famous film star Daphne Kluger, as an unwitting accomplice. The team manipulates Daphne into hiring Rose and convinces Cartier to loan her the Toussaint. Rose and Amita go to Cartier and digitally scan the necklace to manufacture a cubic zirconia replica. 

Nine Ball works on creating a blindspot on the museum's security cameras to move the necklace. Tammy secures a temporary coordinator position at Vogue and gains access to the gala's seating plan, as well as getting Lou hired as a nutritionist for the event, while Debbie leads Daphne to invite art dealer Claude Becker, whose betrayal sent Debbie to prison in the first place, as her date. Lou confronts Debbie for planning revenge against Becker, but she reassures her that it will not jeopardize their plan.

When Rose learns the Toussaint can only be unclasped by a special magnet carried by Cartier's security detail, Nine Ball enlists her younger sister Veronica's help in creating a duplicate. At the gala, Lou spikes Daphne's soup, causing her to rush to the women's bathroom. As the male Cartier guards wait outside and Daphne vomits into a toilet, Constance deftly removes the necklace from her neck and sneaks it to Amita, who splits it into smaller pieces of jewelry. 

When Daphne reappears with the necklace missing, the museum is sealed and a search of the premises and guests commences. It ends, however, when Tammy "finds" the duplicate necklace. Constance slips the Toussaint pieces to the team to smuggle out, and Debbie plants a piece of it on Becker. After the heist, Daphne joins the ladies, revealing that she already knew about the robbery by analyzing their actions. She asks for the eighth part in exchange for saving them from jail.

When the fake necklace is returned to Cartier, the switch is discovered, and insurance investigator John Frazier is assigned to investigate Cartier's claim. Having crossed paths with and sent members of the Ocean family to prison before, Frazier immediately suspects Debbie, but her careful presence on the gala's video footage gives her an unbeatable alibi. She negotiates with him to hand him the thief as well as a part of the necklace. 

Daphne visits Becker and sends Frazier a picture of the jewel Debbie planted. To further frame him, Debbie hires actresses posing as elderly socialites to sell parts of the Toussaint off piece by piece and deposit the money into an account in Becker's name. Becker is taken into custody.

As the eight celebrate their success, Lou reveals the heist's true target: while the gala was being evacuated, she and The Amazing Yen, the acrobat who worked with Danny, replaced a Metropolitan Museum of Art display of royal jewels loaned by European royal families with replicas assembled by Amita, escaping with more gems even more valuable than the Toussaint.

With their payouts from the score much larger than previously promised, each member of the team goes their separate ways: Amita travels to Paris with a man she meets on Tinder; Rose pays off her debts and opens her own store; Constance buys a spacious loft in the city and becomes a YouTuber; Tammy expands her business in stolen goods; Nine Ball opens a pool hall; Daphne becomes a film director (and is shown directing a lookalike); Lou takes her motorcycle on a cross-country road trip; and Debbie mixes and enjoys a martini at Danny's grave, knowing he would be proud of her.

Cast

 Sandra Bullock as Deborah "Debbie" Ocean, a professional thief and Danny Ocean's sister
 Cate Blanchett as Lou Miller, Debbie's partner in crime
 Anne Hathaway as Daphne Kluger, a famous and egotistic actress
 Mindy Kaling as Amita, a jewelry maker
 Sarah Paulson as Tammy, a suburban mom and fence
 Awkwafina as Constance, a loudmouthed street hustler and pickpocket
 Rihanna as Nine Ball / Leslie, a talented hacker
 Helena Bonham Carter as Rose Weil, a ditzy, disgraced fashion designer
 Richard Armitage as Claude Becker, an art dealer who framed Debbie for a crime he instigated
 James Corden as John Frazier, an insurance fraud investigator
 Dakota Fanning as Penelope Stern, a celebrity of whom Daphne is jealous
 Nathanya Alexander as Veronica, Nine Ball's younger sister.
 Damian Young as David Welch
 Griffin Dunne as a parole board officer
 Michael Gandolfini as a bus boy
 Elliott Gould as Reuben Tishkoff, a wealthy casino owner that Danny knew
 Qin Shaobo as "The Amazing" Yen, an acrobat that worked for Danny
 Marlo Thomas, Dana Ivey, Mary Louise Wilson, and Elizabeth Ashley appear as mature actresses who help the crew shift their stolen gems

Celebrities who cameo as themselves in the film include Anna Wintour, Katie Holmes, Maria Sharapova, Serena Williams, Kim Kardashian, Common, Adriana Lima, Desiigner, Kylie Jenner, Alexander Wang, Liu Wen, Kendall Jenner, Gigi Hadid, Lily Aldridge, Olivia Munn, Jaime King, Zac Posen, Hailey Baldwin, Derek Blasberg, Sofia Richie, Heidi Klum, Kelly Rohrbach, Lauren Santo Domingo, Rainey Qualley,.

Matt Damon and Carl Reiner were also set to reprise their respective characters, Linus Caldwell and Saul Bloom, but their scenes were cut.

Production
After the release of Ocean's Thirteen, Steven Soderbergh stated that there would not be an Ocean's Fourteen, noting that George Clooney wanted "to go out strong" with the third film. In December 2008, Soderbergh again said that a fourth film in the franchise was unlikely, this time citing the recent death of Bernie Mac, who had appeared in the earlier films. However, a female-focused spin-off starring Sandra Bullock was in development as of October 2015. Helena Bonham Carter, Cate Blanchett, Mindy Kaling, and Elizabeth Banks were later announced to star in the film, though Banks's presence turned out to be a rumor that did not materialize.

In August 2016, Bullock, Blanchett, Bonham Carter, and Kaling were confirmed to star, with Anne Hathaway, Rihanna, Awkwafina, and Sarah Paulson closing deals to fill the cast. During production on the film, Dakota Fanning and Damian Lewis were spotted on set, with Lewis's casting being confirmed in December 2016 and Fanning confirming her casting in March 2017.

On November 11, 2016, Richard Robichaux was also cast in the film. That same month, Matt Damon stated he would appear in the film, reprising his role from the Ocean's Trilogy; however, his scene was not included in the finished film. In January 2017, James Corden joined the cast as an insurance investigator who begins to grow suspicious of the group. That same month, it was revealed Anna Wintour, Alexander Wang, Zac Posen, Derek Blasberg, Lauren Santo Domingo, Kim Kardashian West, Kendall Jenner, Kylie Jenner, Katie Holmes, Olivia Munn, Hailey Baldwin, and Zayn Malik were announced to cameo in the film. That same month, Richard Armitage joined the cast of the film, replacing Lewis, who had to drop out due to scheduling conflicts.

Principal photography on the film began on October 25, 2016, in New York City. In March 2017, Blanchett said production had officially been completed.

On May 5, 2017, it was announced that filming would continue on Staten Island at the former Arthur Kill Correctional Facility, which Broadway Stages was in the process of acquiring after an initial rejection.

Box office
After premiering at Alice Tully Hall in New York City on June5, 2018, Ocean's 8 was released by Warner Bros. to theaters in North America on June8. Ocean's 8 grossed US$140.2 million in the United States and Canada, and US$157.5 million in other territories, for a total worldwide gross of US$297.7 million, against a production budget of $70 million.

In the United States and Canada, Ocean's 8 was released alongside Hotel Artemis and Hereditary, and was projected to gross around US$45 million from 4,145 theaters in its opening weekend, although some tracking firms had it debuting with as low as $30 million. Deadline Hollywood noted that it was tracking on par with the 2016 all-female Ghostbusters reboot (which opened to $46 million), and had more interest from audiences than the likes of fellow female-led comedies The Heat ($39.1 million debut), Spy ($29.1 million), and Girls Trip ($31.2 million). The film made $4 million from Thursday night previews, including $100,000 from additional early screenings Wednesday night, and $15.8 million on its first day (including previews). It went on to debut to $41.6 million, 69% of its audience was female. In its second weekend the film made $19 million, finishing second behind newcomer Incredibles 2. In its third weekend the film earned $11.6 million, finishing third behind Jurassic World: Fallen Kingdom and Incredibles 2.

Home media
Ocean's 8 was first released on Digital HD on August21, 2018. Warner Bros. Home Entertainment then released the film on DVD, Blu-ray, and 4K UHD Combo Pack on September11, 2018. The film debuted at the top of the NPD VideoScan First Alert chart for the week ending on September 15, 2018.

Reception

Critical response

According to BBC News, critical reviews of the film were "broadly positive", though "most had some reservations". The website's critical consensus reads, "Ocean's 8 isn't quite as smooth as its predecessors, but still has enough cast chemistry and flair to enjoyably lift the price of a ticket from filmgoers up for an undemanding caper." At Metacritic, which assigns a normalized rating to reviews, the film had a weighted average score of 61 out of 100, based on reviews from 50 critics, indicating "generally favorable reviews". Audiences polled by CinemaScore gave the film an average grade of "B+" on an A+ to F scale, the same score earned by Ocean's Eleven and Thirteen. 

Writing for Rolling Stone, Peter Travers gave the film 3 out of 4 stars and praised the cast (namely Bullock, Blanchett and Hathaway), saying, "Ocean's 8 is a heist caper that looks gorgeous, keeps the twists coming and bounces along on a comic rhythm that's impossible to resist. What more do you want in summer escapism?" Alonso Duralde of TheWrap called the film "slick, charming and funny," though added "it never quite kicks into high gear" and said, "Cinematographer Eigil Bryld gives the proceedings the high-gloss of a SkyMall catalog, which is appropriate for a movie about robbing a legendary Cartier necklace at fashion's most exclusive event... And between the sheen and the talented performers, Ocean's 8 does eventually coast on froth and good will."

Varietys Owen Gleiberman said it is "clever enough to get by" and wrote "Ocean's 8 is a casually winning heist movie, no more and no less, but like countless films devoted to the exploits of cool male criminals, it lingers most... as a proudly scurrilous gallery of role models." He found Hathaway "commanding at every moment" and believed Bullock projected "the debauched insolence" and ideological drive of "a hungry criminal", but lamented the scarcity of impressive dialogue for Paulson and Blanchett, who "don't get a chance to create indelible characters". In The Boston Globe, Ty Burr was more impressed by Blanchett's performance ("the Boss of This Movie") and said, apart from Hathaway, the film largely depended on the "established personas" of the actors.

Michael Phillips of the Chicago Tribune gave the film 2 out of 4 stars and said, "Some movies are more about parallel play than actual playground interaction, and despite a screenful of terrifically skillful talents, Ocean's 8 never quite gets its ensemble act together. It's smooth, and far from inept. But it isn't much fun. That's all you want from a certain kind of heist picture, isn't it? Fun?" Writing for the Chicago Sun-Times, Richard Roeper said the cast "banters beautifully, but the heist is a bit too breezy", lacking a "formidable, hiss-worthy villain" and "darker, more challenging, more nuanced adventure".

Manohla Dargis, writing for the New York Times, said “The bad ex angle isn’t worked too hard or too long, but it means that even when women are running a multimillion-dollar con they have to make room for guy troubles, which is a drag”. Dargis classifies the film as a “needless narrative filler” and concluded that “A lot of this is fun to watch but would have been more breezily enjoyable if the movie played as lightly (and seriously) with gender as much as it does with genre.”

Actor's response
Kaling attributed the mixed reception to the dominance of male critics and a lack of diversity among mainstream film critics. In an interview with Yahoo! Movies, Kaling cited actress Meryl Streep's criticism of Rotten Tomatoes and said, "There is obviously an audience out there who want to watch things like [Ocean's 8], what I work on, what Sarah [Paulson] works on... I think white men, critics would enjoy [the film], would enjoy my work, but often I think there is a critic who will damn it in a way because they don't understand it, because they come at it at a different point of view, and they're so powerful, Rotten Tomatoes."

Several film journalists strongly disagreed with claims that the reception had been dictated by the gender and ethnicity of the critics. Guy Lodge, a chief film critic for Variety, highlighted the fact that several female reviewers, including Emily Yoshida from Vulture and Time magazine's Stephanie Zacharek, concurred with the negative response of some male film critics. Justin Chang, an Asian-American critic for the Los Angeles Times, argued that film criticism needed increased diversity, but "We negate the possibility of sympathetic imagination when we assume that someone’s particular affinity for a work of art will be dictated in advance by specifics of race, gender and age." He instead argued that the benefits would be a broader pool of talent and perspectives. Donald Clarke from The Irish Times pointed out that the film had received a "fresh" rating on Rotten Tomatoes, and a better score than Ocean's Twelve.

In an interview with Refinery 29, Olivia Milch was asked by Scott Meyers, “Did you feel like as a woman working on this major movie (Oceans 8) with all-female cast, there was more pressure to succeed, and get it right?” and she responded “sometimes I’d look over and say: ‘Oh my god, there’s eight women onscreen right now, this is amazing!’ But it’s a shame that, because the percentage of films that are either made by women or with female protagonists is so low, there does tend to be this pressure to perform very well, or if you screw up, then you’re never going to get the chance again.”

Accolades

See also
 Films set in New York City

References

External links
 
 
 

Ocean's (film series)
2018 films
2018 comedy films
2018 crime thriller films
2010s American films
2010s buddy comedy films
2010s comedy thriller films
2010s crime comedy films
2010s English-language films
2010s female buddy films
2010s heist films
American buddy comedy films
American comedy thriller films
American crime comedy films
American crime thriller films
American female buddy films
American feminist comedy films
American films about revenge
American heist films
American sequel films
Film spin-offs
Films based on works by George Clayton Johnson
Films directed by Gary Ross
Films produced by Steven Soderbergh
Films scored by Daniel Pemberton
Films set in 2008
Films set in 2018
Films set in Manhattan
Films set in museums
Films set in New Jersey
Films shot in New York City
Smokehouse Pictures films
Village Roadshow Pictures films
Warner Bros. films